The Western Middle Anthracite Field is a large basin containing veins of anthracite coal in Pennsylvania. The region is in the Appalachian Mountains and is the third-largest anthracite field in the anthracite region in Eastern Pennsylvania behind the Southern and Northern Fields. The field is located above the Southern Anthracite Field strays between Schuylkill County, Pennsylvania and Northumberland County, Pennsylvania in Central Eastern Pennsylvania.

History
Much of the history of the Western Middle Anthracite Field aligns with much of the other significant events in the Coal Region in Pennsylvania. Yet, the region is specifically famous for housing the town of Shenandoah, Pennsylvania, the famous hotbed of unionization in the coaling industry and of the Molly Maguires in the 1870s. In the 1890s, the two Schuylkill fields, the Southern and the Western Middle Fields, were a hotbed of the United Mine Workers Union. In 1902 President Theodore Roosevelt had to send U.S. National Guard troops to the region during the Coal Strike of 1902 and laid out his new precedent on solving labor disputes, holding both the company and its workers in equal regard.

References

Anthracite Coal Region of Pennsylvania